The Cathedral of St. Mary and St. John is an Anglican church in Quezon City, Metro Manila, Philippines. It serves as the National Cathedral of the Episcopal Church in the Philippines.

It was established by Bishop Charles Henry Brent from the then Protestant Episcopal Church of the United States of America initially catering to American and European expatriates in the Philippines. It later also served Filipinos. The groundbreaking of the original church building in Manila situated near Isaac Peral Street was made on January 25, 1905. The construction finished in 1907. The building funded through donations cost at least $120 thousand.

The building was seized by the Japanese on July 8, 1944, during the Japanese occupation of the Philippines amidst World War II and was used as an internment camp. It was destroyed during the Battle of Manila of 1945. The Manila Pavilion Hotel currently occupies the old site.

Bishop Lyman C. Ogilby held talks with John Van Wie Bergamini, the veteran architect of the Episcopal Church throughout the Far East in 1954 in America which led to the construction of the structure currently occupied by the cathedral which was consecrated on February 9, 1962.

References

Protestantism in the Philippines
Buildings and structures in Quezon City
Churches in Quezon City
1903 establishments in the Philippines
Churches completed in 1962
20th-century churches in the Philippines